The non-marine molluscs of Pitcairn Islands are a part of the molluscan fauna of the Pitcairn Islands.

 Pitcairn Island: 24 species of land snails and one semi-terrestrial gastropod
 Henderson Island: 16 species (7 families) of land snails and two semi-terrestrial molluscs
 Ducie Island: less than six species of land snails
 Oeno Island: less than six species of land snails

There is a high degree of endemism of these species.

Gastropoda

Land gastropods 
Land gastropods and semi-terrestrial gastropods include:

Hydrocenidae
 Georissa hendersoni Preece, 1995 - Henderson Island
 Georissa minutissima (G. B. Sowerby, 1832) - Pitcairn Island

Helicinidae
 Orobophana solidula (G. B. Sowerby in Gray, 1839) - Henderson Island

Assimineidae
 Assiminea sp. - Henderson Island, Pitcairn Island

Ellobiidae
 Allochroa layardi (H. & A. Adams, 1855) - Henderson Island, Oeno Island
 Melampus flavus (Gmelin, 1791) - Henderson Island, Oeno Island, Ducie Island, Pitcairn Island

Achatinellidae
 Tubuaia fosbergi Kondo, 1962 - Pitcairn Island
 Tubuaia hendersoni Kondo, 1962 - Henderson Island
 Tubuaia voyana christiani Kondo, 1962 - Pitcairn Island
 Pacificella variabilis Odhner, 1922 - Henderson Island, Ducie Island, Pitcairn Island
 Pacificella filica Preece, 1995 - Pitcairn Island
 Lamellidea cf. micropleura Cooke & Kondo, 1961 - Henderson Island, Pitcairn Island
 Lamellidea oblonga (Pease, 1865) - Henderson Island, Pitcairn Island
 Lamellidea sp. - Henderson Island, Oeno Island, Pitcairn Island
 Elasmias sp. - Henderson Island, Pitcairn Island
 Tornatellides oblongus (Anton, 1839)
 Tornatellides oblongus oblongus (Anton, 1839) - Pitcairn Island
 Tornatellides oblongus parvulus Cooke & Kondo, 1961 - Henderson Island

Pupillidae
 Pupisoma orcula (Benson, 1850) - Henderson Island, Pitcairn Island

Vertiginidae
 Nesopupa cf. pleurophora (Shuttleworth, 1852) - Henderson Island
 Nesopupa sp. nov. - Henderson Island
 cf. Columella sp. - Oeno island
 Pronesopupa sp. - Henderson Island

Subulinidae
 Subulina octona (Bruguière, 1789) - Pitcairn Island, introduced
 Opeas pumilum (Pfeiffer, 1840) - Pitcairn Island, introduced
 Allopeas clavulinum (Potiez & Michaud, 1838) - Pitcairn Island, introduced
 Allopeas gracile (Hutton, 1834) - Pitcairn Island, introduced

Endodontidae
 Minidonta hendersoni Cooke & Solem in Solem, 1976 - Henderson Island

Charopidae
 Sinployea pitcairnensis Preece, 1995 - Pitcairn Island

Helicarionidae
 Philonesia pitcairnensis Baker, 1838 - Pitcairn Island
 Philonesia filiceti (Beck, 1837) - Pitcairn Island
 Diastole glaucina Baker, 1938 - Henderson Island
 Diastole tenuistriata Preece, 1995 - Pitcairn Island

Pristilomatidae
 Hawaiia minuscula (A. Binney, 1840) - Pitcairn Island, introduced

Gastrodontidae
 Zonitoides arboreus (Say, 1817) - Pitcairn Island, introduced

Agriolimacidae
 Deroceras sp. - Pitcairn Island, introduced

See also
 List of marine molluscs of the Pitcairn Islands
 List of non-marine molluscs of the Gambier Islands
 List of non-marine molluscs of the Cook Islands
 List of non-marine molluscs of Hawaii
 List of non-marine molluscs of Easter Island

References

Further reading
 Preece R. C. (1995) Systematic review of the land snails of the Pitcairn Islands. In: The Pitcairn Islands: biogeography, ecology and prehistory. Benton T. G. & Spencer T. (eds.) London, Academic Press.
 12: "The Pitcairn Islands" The Pitcairn Islands. pages 88–95.

Molluscs
Moll
Pitcairn Islands
Pitcairn Islands
Pitcairn Islands